Aurora Central Catholic High School (ACC) is a Roman Catholic secondary school under the direction of the Diocese of Rockford. ACC began as two separate secondary schools in 1926. Madonna Catholic High School, a girls school, and Roncalli High School, a boys school, merged in 1968 to become Aurora Central Catholic. The first campus was located on the east side of Aurora, Illinois, in what is now Cowherd Middle School. The school moved to its current location, on Aurora's west side, in 1995. The 2017 student body was about 630 students.

Academics 
Aurora Central Catholic requires 28 credits for graduation. However, because of the block scheduling system, many students graduate with 30 or 32 credits. There is a wide range of courses and levels offered which includes honors, independent study, and Advanced Placement (AP) courses.

The Aurora Central Catholic High School Class of 2009 had ten Illinois State Scholars. This year ACC claimed its college-bound students earned over $5.2 million in scholarship money. This amount is higher than the Class of 2006's $3.7 million. Over 95% of ACC graduates go on to secondary education at various respective universities and colleges throughout the country. The school was recognized as one of the top 50 Catholic high schools in the United States in 2004 and 2005.

Athletics 
As of 2014, ACC participates in multiple classes (depending on the sport) in the Illinois High School Association. ACC is a member of the Metro Suburban Conference West Division. The Metro Suburban Conference includes members of the disbanded Suburban Christian Conference and former members of the disbanded Private School League. Teams are stylized as the Chargers.

Notable alumni
 Kevin Dunn, actor
 Joe Birkett, DuPage County, Illinois, State's Attorney
 Bob Kipper, Major League Baseball player and coach
 Tim Buckley, NCAA Men's Basketball Coach Indiana University
 Kathleen Vinehout, Wisconsin State Senate

References

External links
 Aurora Central Catholic High School
 Central Times Online, ACC student newspaper website
 Illinois High School Association, detailed athletics information

Roman Catholic Diocese of Rockford
Catholic secondary schools in Illinois
Educational institutions established in 1968
Educational institutions established in 1926
Education in Aurora, Illinois
1926 establishments in Illinois